Aaron C. Jeffery is a Logie Award-winning New Zealand-Australian actor. He is best known for his roles as Terry Watson in Water Rats, as Alex Ryan in McLeod's Daughters, and as Matt "Fletch" Fletcher in Wentworth.

Early and personal life
Born in Howick, Auckland, Jeffery moved to Australia at the age of 17 and studied acting at NIDA.

Jeffery has been in a relationship with his former McLeod's Daughters co-star Zoe Naylor since 2010. The couple had their first child together, a daughter, in 2012. Jeffery also has another daughter from a previous relationship.

Career
After graduating in 1993 from NIDA, he began his television career on the children's programme Ship to Shore. Jeffery is best known for his role as Alex Ryan in the drama McLeod's Daughters, which he left in 2008. He also appeared in the third season of the New Zealand drama series Outrageous Fortune.

Jeffery appeared in the series Underbelly: Badness as Frank. He wrapped filming on 22 June. Three days later, it was announced Jeffery had joined the cast of Neighbours as Bradley Fox for two months. In October, it was revealed that Jeffery had been cast as a corrections officer in the series Wentworth. He also starred in the Bevan Lee series Between Two Worlds for the Seven Network. In 2021 Jeffery appeared in the AACTA nominated film Moon Rock For Monday directed by Kurt Martin. The film was nominated for Best Indie Film at the 11th Annual AACTA Awards.

In April 2021, it was announced that Jeffery had been cast in the upcoming Netflix thriller series Pieces of Her, which is adapted from the Karin Slaughter novel of the same name.

Awards
In both 2004 and 2007, Jeffery won the Silver Logie for Most Popular Actor in a Drama Series for his role on McLeod's Daughters.

Filmography

References

External links

 Talent agency profile
 Talent agency PDF
 
 
 

1970 births
AACTA Award winners
Australian male film actors
Australian male television actors
Living people
Logie Award winners
Male actors from South Australia
National Institute of Dramatic Art alumni
New Zealand emigrants to Australia
New Zealand male film actors
New Zealand male television actors
People from Auckland
20th-century Australian male actors
20th-century New Zealand male actors
21st-century Australian male actors
21st-century New Zealand male actors